Kaagaz Ki Nao is a 1975 Bollywood film directed by B. R. Ishara.

Cast
Raj Kiran   
Pradeep Kumar   
Sarika

Soundtrack
"Na Jaiyo Re Sautan Ghar Saiyan" - Asha Bhosle
"Har Janam Me Hamara Milan" - Manhar Udhas, Asha Bhosle 
"Aaj Sakhi Mai Babul Ka Ghar" - Manna Dey
"Main Tumhare Khayalon Mein" - Asha Bhosle

References

External links
 

1975 films
1970s Hindi-language films
Films directed by B. R. Ishara